A witch hunter is a person who seeks witches in a witch-hunt.

Witch hunter or variations may also refer to:

Literature
 Witch Hunter (manhwa), Korean manhwa series
 The Witch Hunter (novel), by Bernard Knight
 The Witch Hunters (novel), by Steve Lyons

Film
 Witch Hunter Robin, a 2002 anime series
 El Cazador de la Bruja (English: The Hunter of the Witch), a 2007 anime series
 Hansel & Gretel: Witch Hunters, a 2012 film
 The Last Witch Hunter, a 2015 American film starring Vin Diesel

Music
 Witch Hunter (album) (1985), by Grave Digger
 The Witch Hunter (1993), album by Shinjuku Thief

Other uses
 Witch Hunter: The Invisible World, a 2007 role-playing game

See also
 Witch hunt (disambiguation)
 Witch trial (disambiguation)
 Witchfinder (disambiguation)
 Witchfinder General (disambiguation)